DeQuin Lee Evans (born May 17, 1987) is an American professional Canadian football defensive lineman for the BC Lions of the Canadian Football League (CFL). He played college football at Los Angeles Harbor College and Kentucky. He is married to Nova Scotian Olympic runner Jenna Martin-Evans.

Early life
Evans grew up in Compton, California; many of his friends were gang members. He spent time in Camp Kilpatrick, a juvenile detention facility. While watching Gridiron Gang, a film based on Camp Kilpatrick, Evans saw his bed. Later, he worked at Albertsons, bagging groceries. His cousin, Hershel Dennis, a running back at USC, was instrumental in obtaining permission for Evans sit in on classes.

College career
Evans enrolled at Los Angeles Harbor College and played there in 2007 and 2008. He transferred to Kentucky. Childhood friend and LAHC teammate Chris Matthews also transferred to Kentucky. He played for Kentucky in 2009 and 2010. He was a captain for Kentucky in 2010.

Professional career
After going undrafted in the 2011 NFL draft, Evans signed with the Cincinnati Bengals. In November 2011, Evans was suspended for four games. On August 30, 2013, Evans was suspended for eight games. Cincinnati released Evans in November 2013.

Evans signed with the Calgary Stampeders in May 2014.  He played in nine games (seven starts) during the 2014 campaign and was a part of the 102nd Grey Cup championship team.

He signed with the Montreal Alouettes on February 15, 2016 but suffered a torn foot tendon near the end of training camp and dressed for just five games that season.

He signed with the BC Lions on February 16, 2017.

Other media
On the November 7, 2013, episode of Impact Wrestling, Evans and Bengals teammate and former TNA World Tag Team Champion Adam Jones, were sitting front row, and got into an "altercation" with Bad Influence (Christopher Daniels and Kazarian), who pushed both players, leading them to jump the guardrail and bodyslam both wrestlers in the ring.

References

External links
 Canadian Football League profile
 
 

1987 births
Living people
American football defensive linemen
American players of Canadian football
Canadian football defensive linemen
Kentucky Wildcats football players
Los Angeles Harbor Seahawks football players
Calgary Stampeders players
Montreal Alouettes players
BC Lions players
Cincinnati Bengals players
Players of American football from Compton, California
American sportspeople of Samoan descent